Ivan Vasilyevich Spiridonov (October 23, 1905, Pogibalovka, Nizhny Novgorod Governorate – July 7, 1991, Moscow) was a Soviet statesman and party leader. In 1954–1962, he was the First Secretary of the Leningrad City Committee, then the Regional Committee of the Communist Party of the Soviet Union. In 1959–1962 – Member of the Bureau of the Central Committee of the Communist Party of the Soviet Union for the Russian Soviet Federative Socialist Republic. In 1962–1970 – Chairman of the Council of the Union of the Supreme Soviet of the Soviet Union.

Biography
Born into a peasant family. Since 1925 – a mechanic, head of the technical control department of the shop. In 1939, he graduated from the Leningrad Correspondence Industrial Institute. Since 1939, in engineering and technical positions, director of the Oryol Textile Machinery Plant. In 1941, the plant was evacuated to Kuznetsk, Penza Region, was transformed into the Kuznetsk Textile Engineering Plant and redesigned to produce products for the Special Forces Missile Forces. In 1944–1950, he was the director of the Leningrad Gosmetr Plant. In 1950–1952, he was Secretary of the Moscow District Committee of the All–Union Communist Party (Bolsheviks) of the city of Leningrad.

In 1952, Ivan Spiridonov became Deputy Chairman of the Leningrad Regional Executive Committee, and in 1954, he took over as Secretary of the Leningrad Regional Committee of the Communist Party of the Soviet Union. In July 1956 – December 1957 – 1st Secretary of the Leningrad City Committee of the Communist Party of the Soviet Union.

First Secretary of the Leningrad Regional Committee of the Communist Party of the Soviet Union from December 24, 1957 to May 3, 1962. Having taken the chair of the First Secretary of the Regional Committee after the departure of Frol Kozlov, Spiridonov directed most of his efforts to housing construction. Under him, new standard designs of not very comfortable, but cheap houses ("Khrushchyovkas") were developed, large construction trusts appeared, which switched to the method of complex development of entire residential areas. In the same period, through traffic was opened along the Moscow–Leningrad Highway. The scientific and technical base of Leningrad developed at a rapid pace. The construction of scientific campuses began in the districts of Pesochny, Krasnoye Selo, Gatchina, Kirovsk and others. The development of fundamental scientific research contributed to the flourishing of the defense industry, whose enterprises began to determine the entire structure of the local industry and directly influence the rate of economic development of the region.

In 1961, at the 22nd Congress of the Communist Party of the Soviet Union, as the head of the Leningrad delegation, he proposed the removal of body of Stalin from the Mausoleum.

Member of the Central Committee of the Communist Party of the Soviet Union (1961–1971). Member of the Bureau of the Central Committee of the Communist Party of the Soviet Union for the Russian Soviet Federative Socialist Republic (1959 – November 23, 1962). Deputy of the Supreme Soviet of the Soviet Union of the 5th–8th convocations.

Secretary of the Central Committee of the Communist Party of the Soviet Union from October 31, 1961 to April 23, 1962.

From April 23, 1962 to June 14, 1970 – Chairman of the Council of the Union of the Supreme Soviet of the Soviet Union.

Since July 1970 – a personal pensioner of union significance. He died on July 7, 1991 in Moscow. He was buried at the Troyekurovskoye Cemetery.

References

Sources

Biography of Ivan Spiridonov on the Russian Biography Website

1905 births
1991 deaths
Chairmen of the Soviet of the Union
Governors of Saint Petersburg
Secretariat of the Central Committee of the Communist Party of the Soviet Union members
Fifth convocation members of the Supreme Soviet of the Soviet Union
Sixth convocation members of the Supreme Soviet of the Soviet Union
Seventh convocation members of the Supreme Soviet of the Soviet Union
Eighth convocation members of the Supreme Soviet of the Soviet Union
Recipients of the Order of Friendship of Peoples
Recipients of the Order of Lenin
Recipients of the Order of the Red Banner of Labour
Burials in Troyekurovskoye Cemetery